The Nokia 6610 is a handset by Nokia that uses the Series 40 platform and J2ME (Java). The device features text and picture messaging, a WAP browser, Stereo FM radio, Polyphonic ringtones and a 128x128, 4096-colour display. It is essentially the same phone feature-wise as the Nokia 7210, the 6610 being a more business-oriented version with a more conservatively-styled face plate and keypad layout, in contrast with the fashion-oriented 7210. It was introduced at CommunicAsia in June 2002 and was released in Q3 of the year.

Variants

6610i
The Nokia 6610i mobile telephone is an improved version of the Nokia 6610 with a built-in digital camera, launched in 2002. The phone's internals are taken from the Nokia 7250i, and use the same software, both supporting XHTML. The Nokia 6610i is aimed at business users, while the Nokia 7250i is intended more to be a fashion phone.

CDMA variant - 6585
The Nokia 6585 is a physically identical variant of the 6610 for CDMA2000 1xRTT networks. Like its GSM cousin, the 6585 comes in a similar form factor, and can be customised with interchangeable face plates.

AMPS/D-AMPS-based model - 6560
The Nokia 6560 model is a variant of the 6610 designed for North American markets that uses Digital AMPS ("TDMA")/AMPS technology. As with the CDMA and GSM variants, the 6560 uses the same fascia and form factor.  This was Nokia's most feature-rich D-AMPS phone to ever be released, and only one of two models with a color display (the other being the Nokia 3560).

References

External links
Nokia 6610i review
Nokia 6610i manual
Nokia 6610 LCD Interfacing with Atmega32

6610
Mobile phones introduced in 2002
Mobile phones with infrared transmitter